Eurhynchium praelongum is a species of moss with a widespread distribution. Found in Australia, New Zealand, North America, northern South America, Eurasia and North Africa
.

In a study of the effect of the herbicide Asulam on moss growth, Eurhynchium praelongum was shown to have intermediate sensitivity to Asulam exposure.

References 

Flora of Australia
Flora of New Zealand
Flora of South America
Flora of North America
Flora of Africa
Flora of Europe
Flora of Great Britain
Hypnales